X-mode may refer to:

 The extraordinary mode, an electromagnetic wave mode for propagation in a cold magnetoplasma
  X-Mode, a US data broker specialized in location data
 X-MODE, an AWD-system from Subaru, used in the Toyota bZ4X.

See also
Mode X, an alternative video graphics display mode of IBM VGA graphics hardware